My Song may refer to:
 My Song (Keith Jarrett album), 1978
 My Song (Joe Pass album), 1993
 "My Song" (Johnny Ace song), the 1952 debut single by Johnny Ace
 "My Song" (Jerry Cantrell song)", a 1998 single by Jerry Cantrell from Boggy Depot
 "My Song", by Labi Siffre from the 1972 album Crying Laughing Loving Lying